Rockport, West Virginia may refer to:

Rockport, Wetzel County, West Virginia
Rockport, Wood County, West Virginia